The International Academy of Film and Television (IAFT) is a trade film school offering diploma and certificate programs in filmmaking, acting, and 3D animation. IAFT includes significant amounts of hands-on practical experience under the care and guidance of recognized industry mentors in its programs. IAFT Cebu was also voted as "one of the best film schools in the world" by the Hollywood Reporter.

History

In 2004 Bigfoot Entertainment began training Cebuanos in camera operation. Within a year, in response to the growing demand for film education, the doors of IAFT were opened to full-time filmmaking students. The school was formed with the intention of hiring graduates for the affiliates, Bigfoot Studios and Fashion TV Philippines and Singapore. IAFT has expanded to offer certificate and diploma programs in filmmaking, acting and 3D animation, as well as short-term workshops.

Mission
IAFT’s mission is to nurture the creativity and individual talents of their students, to cultivate today’s independent global filmmakers, and to build upon the entertainment traditions of Hollywood and other film capitals of the world. They place a strong emphasis on professional standards - using the latest filmmaking & acting techniques and equipment - taught by highly experienced industry professionals.

Programs
IAFT offers diploma and certificate programs in filmmaking and acting. The schools course of study includes sound design, photography, and script writing. IAFT's programs incorporate a minimum of 60 hours of internship within the professional industry, and acting programs require public performance to be undertaken regularly.

Diploma Program in Filmmaking
Certificate Program in Filmmaking
Diploma Program in Performing Arts - Acting
Certificate Program in Performing Arts - Acting
Diploma Program in 3D Animation
Certificate Program in 3D Animation
Short-term Workshops e.g. On-camera Acting Workshop & Filmmaking Workshop

Notable alumni 

 Sujay Dahake - known for his work as director and as editor for the film Shala, Ajoba and Phuntroo
 Jamie Herrell - known for winning the Miss Philippines Earth 2014 and Miss Earth 2014 titles

Accreditations
Technical Education and Skills Development Authority
Bureau of Immigration (Philippines)
United States Veteran Association (USVA)

Affiliates
Parent Company - Bigfoot Entertainment
Sister Company - Fashion One
Educational Partner - Final Draft

References

External links
International Academy of Film and Television official website

Education in Lapu-Lapu City
Film schools in the Philippines
Universities and colleges in Metro Cebu
Vocational education in the Philippines